This is a list of, in the United Kingdom, the Crown Dependencies, and British Overseas Territories, schools that only admit girls, or those that only admit girls at certain levels, years, or grades—or those that follow the Diamond Schools model, which separates students by gender at points.

England
 Bedfordshire
 Bedford Girls' School
 Bedford High School, Bedfordshire and Dame Alice Harpur School merged into Bedford Girls'
 Challney High School for Girls
 Berkshire
 The Abbey School, Reading
 Downe House School (Cold Ash)
 Heathfield School, Ascot
 The Marist Schools
 Queen Anne's School
 St Gabriel's School (coed junior school, girls only from ages 12-18)
 St George's School, Ascot
 St Mary's School Ascot
 Windsor Girls' School
 Bristol
 Badminton School
 Montpelier High School
 Redmaids' High School
 Redland High School for Girls and The Red Maids' School merged into Redmaids' High
 Buckinghamshire
 Dr Challoner's High School
 Pipers Corner School
 Wycombe Abbey
 Cambridgeshire
 St Mary's School, Cambridge
 Cheshire
 Alderley Edge School for Girls
 Queen's School, Chester
 Cornwall
 Truro High School
 County Durham
 Durham High School for Girls
 Devon
 Devonport High School for Girls
 The Maynard School
 Torquay Girls' Grammar School
 Dorset
 Sherborne School for Girls
 Talbot Heath School
 East Riding of Yorkshire
 Newland School for Girls
 East Sussex
 Brighton and Hove High School
 Mayfield School, Mayfield (formerly St Leonards-Mayfield School)
 Roedean School
 Essex
 Chelmsford County High School for Girls (Grammar - entry by 11+)
 Colchester County High School for Girls (Grammar - entry by 11+)
 Southend High School for Girls (Grammar - entry by 11+)
 Westcliff High School for Girls (Grammar - entry by 11+)
 New Hall School Girls' Senior School
 St Mary's School, Colchester
 Gloucestershire
 Cheltenham Ladies' College
 Westonbirt School
 Greater London
 James Allen's Girls' School
 Ayesha Siddiqa Girls School
 Blackheath High School
 Bromley High School
 Camden School for Girls
 Channing School
 Chislehurst School for Girls
 City of London School for Girls
 Connaught School for Girls
 Croydon High School
 Francis Holland School
 Glendower Preparatory School
 Godolphin and Latymer School
 Harris Girls' Academy East Dulwich
 Henrietta Barnett School
 Hornsey School for Girls
 La Retraite Roman Catholic Girls' School
 Lady Eleanor Holles School
 The Laurels School
 Madani Girls' School
 Marymount International School London
 Newstead Wood School
 North London Collegiate School
 Northwood College
 Notting Hill and Ealing High School
 Old Palace School
 Palmers Green High School
 Putney High School
 Queen Elizabeth's School for Girls
 Queen's College, London
 Queen's Gate School
 South Hampstead High School
 St Catherine's School, Twickenham
 St Helen's School
 St James Independent Schools Senior Girls School
 St Margaret's School Hampstead
 St Martin-in-the-Fields High School for Girls
 St Paul's Girls' School
 Streatham and Clapham High School
 Surbiton High School (coeducational ages 4-11, and girls until 18)
 Sutton High School, London
 Sydenham High School
 Tayyibah Girls' School
 Tiffin Girls' School
 Ursuline Preparatory School
 Waldegrave School
 Walthamstow School for Girls
 The Ellen Wilkinson School for Girls
 Wimbledon High School
 Greater Manchester
 Altrincham Grammar School for Girls
 Bolton School Single Sex Junior, Senior, and Sixth Form schools
 Bolton Muslim Girls' School
 Bury Grammar School (for girls)
 Fairfield High School for Girls
 Flixton Girls' School
 Manchester High School for Girls
 Whalley Range High School
 Withington Girls' School
 Hampshire
 Farnborough Hill
 Portsmouth High School, Southsea
 St Nicholas' School, Hampshire
 St Swithun's School, Winchester
 Hertfordshire
 Abbot's Hill School
 Berkhamsted School Separate Girls' Senior School
 Haberdashers' Girls' School (formerly Haberdashers' Aske's School for Girls)
 Hitchin Girls' School
 Queenswood School
 The Royal Masonic School for Girls (Nursery is coeducational but further grades are girls' only)
 St Albans High School for Girls
 St Albans Girls' School
 St Francis' College, Letchworth
 St Margaret's School, Bushey
 Watford Grammar School for Girls
 Kent
 Benenden School
 Cobham Hall School
 Dartford Grammar School for Girls
 Kent College, Pembury
 Maidstone Grammar School for Girls
 Walthamstow Hall
 Wilmington Grammar School for Girls
 Lancashire
 Lancaster Girls' Grammar School
 Penwortham Girls' High School
 Tauheedul Islam Girls' High School
 Leicestershire
 Leicester High School for Girls
 Loughborough High School
 Loughborough Amherst School (formerly Our Lady's Convent School) - Coed ages 4-11 then girls only until 18
 Lincolnshire
 Boston High School
 Kesteven and Grantham Girls' School
 Stamford High School, Lincolnshire
 Merseyside
 Birkenhead High School Academy (Wirral)
 Greenbank High School 
 Merchant Taylors' Girls' School
 North Yorkshire
 Harrogate Ladies' College (coeducational for ages 2-11 with girls' only until age 18)
 The Mount School, York
 Queen Margaret's School, York
 Queen Mary's School
Skipton Girls' High School
Northamptonshire
 Northampton High School, England
 Southfield School
 Norfolk
 Hethersett Old Hall School (coeducational for ages 3-11 with girls' only until age 18)
 Norwich High School for Girls
 Nottinghamshire
 Nottingham Girls' High School
 Oxfordshire
 Cranford House School
 Headington School
 Oxford High School, England
 Rye St Antony School
 St Helen and St Katharine
 Tudor Hall School, Banbury
 Shropshire
 Adcote School
 Moreton Hall School
 Shrewsbury High School, Shropshire (coed from ages 3-13 and girls only ages 13-18)
 Somerset
 Bruton School for Girls
 Royal High School, Bath
 South Yorkshire
 Sheffield High School, South Yorkshire
 Surrey
 Manor House School, Little Bookham
 Notre Dame School, Surrey
 Prior's Field School
 Rosebery School
 Sir William Perkins's School
 St Catherine's School, Bramley
 St Teresa's School Effingham
 Tormead School
 Woldingham School
 Tyne and Wear
 Newcastle High School for Girls
 Newcastle upon Tyne Church High School (merged into Newcastle High School for Girls)
 Westfield School, Newcastle upon Tyne
 Warwickshire
 The King's High School for Girls
 The Kingsley School (coed for preparatory school, girls only for senior school and sixth form)
 Stratford Grammar School for Girls (also known as Shottery School)
 West Midlands
 Birmingham
 Edgbaston High School
 Handsworth Wood Girls' Academy
 Hillcrest School, Birmingham
 Hodge Hill Girls' School
 King Edward VI Camp Hill School for Girls
 King Edward VI High School for Girls
 King Edward VI Northfield School for Girls
 Kings Norton Girls' School
 Selly Park Girls' School
 St Paul's School for Girls
 Swanshurst School
 West Sussex
 Burgess Hill Girls
 Farlington School (has boys only at reception)
 West Yorkshire
 Bradford Girls' Grammar School (coed ages 5-11, girls only ages 11-18)
 Gateways School (coed until age 11, girls only ages 11-18)
 Wakefield Girls' High School
 Wiltshire
 Godolphin School
 St Mary's School, Calne
 St Mary's School, Shaftesbury
 Worcestershire
 Malvern St James
 RGS Dodderhill
 St Mary's School, Worcester

Former girls' schools in England
 Amberfield School (girls only for ages 7-16)
 Brigidine School, became Queensmead School Windsor, became coeducational, and closed
 Cambridgeshire High School for Girls which became the Long Road Sixth Form College
 Carlisle & County High School for Girls (now (Richard Rose Central Academy)
 Casterton School (became coeducational for a year and merged into Sedbergh School)
 Clarendon School for Girls (merged with Monkton Combe School)
 Commonweal Lodge (Closed)
 Derby High School, Derbyshire (previously girls' only for years 7-12 but will begin admitting boys for those years in 2019, making it fully coeducational)
 Donnison School, Sunderland Closed)
 Downham School
 Droylsden School, Mathematics and Computing College for Girls, merged with Littlemoss High School to form Droylsden Academy
 Heatherton House School (merged into Berkhamsted School)
 Heathfield School, Pinner
 Ipswich High School (Suffolk) - Became coeducational in 2018
 Leeds Girls' High School, merged with Leeds Grammar School into the Grammar School at Leeds
 Leweston School, previously had a girls' only senior school, later became fully coeducational
 Manchester Central High School for Girls, which merged into Manchester Academy in 1967
 St Martha's Catholic School for Girls, became Mount House School, and as of 2018 is coeducational
 The Peterborough School (fully coeducational since 2010)
 Princess Helena College (became coeducational in 2019)
 The Royal School, Hampstead
 The Royal School, Haslemere (became a Diamond school in 2011)
 St Dominic's Grammar School (became coeducational by 2018)
 St Dominic's Priory School, Stone (now coeducational)
 St Joseph's Convent School, Reading, which became coeducational and is now St Joseph's College, Reading
 St Mary's School, Wantage
 Stonar School (became coeducational)
 Westholme School - Previously had a separate girls' junior school
 Winchester County High School for Girls - Now The Westgate School, Winchester (coeducational)
 Wykeham House School - had separate boys and girls schools - closed

Teesside High School used the Diamond model for a period but no longer does.

Northern Ireland
 Belfast Model School for Girls
 Hunterhouse College

Scotland
 The Mary Erskine School, Edinburgh
 Kilgraston School, Perth
 Butterstone House School (merged with Kilgraston School)

 St George's School, Edinburgh
 St Margaret's School for Girls, Aberdeen

Former girls' schools
 Glasgow Industrial School for Girls
 St Margaret's School, Edinburgh
 St Leonards School (became coeducational beginning in 1999)
 Hutchesons' Grammar School (had separate girls' school - became coeducational in 1976)
 Notre Dame High School, Glasgow (became coeducational in 2019)
 Park School for Girls, Glasgow (closed in 1996)

Wales
 Haberdashers' Monmouth School for Girls
 Howell's School, Llandaff

 Former schools
Aberdare Girls' School
Cowbridge Girls School
Howell's School, Denbigh. Now Middleton College International School
St.Brigid's School, Denbigh. Now a co-educational state school
Lowther College, Flint
Kent College, North Wales

Crown Dependencies
 Guernsey
 Ladies' College, Guernsey
 Jersey
 Beaulieu Convent School
 Jersey College for Girls

British Overseas Territories
 Bermuda
 Bermuda High School
 Gibraltar
 Formerly for girls only: Westside School, Gibraltar (now coeducational)

See also
 Girls' Schools Association
 Girls' Day School Trust
 List of boys' schools in the United Kingdom

References

Girls
Girls' schools in the United Kingdom
United Kingdom